Hilarographa johnibradleyi is a species of moth of the family Tortricidae. It is found in Thailand.

The wingspan is about 15 mm. The ground colour of the distal third of the forewings is and a series of spots across the middle is orange brick. There are a few whitish spots, as well as two brown spots at the tornal part of the termen. The median area of the wing is brown and the basal third brownish with yellow and golden yellow hues marked with a whitish line and diffuse spots. The hindwings are pale brownish, but dark brown on the peripheries.

Etymology
The species is named in honour of Dr. John D. Bradley, who collected the species.

References

Moths described in 2009
Hilarographini